Amílcar is a Spanish and Portuguese male given name derived from Latin Hamilcar,  itself a Punic name known to the Romans through their Carthaginian foes, especially Hamilcar Barca.  

Notable people with the name Amílcar include:  

 Amílcar Álvarez, Argentine swimmer  
 Amílcar Barbuy, Brazilian footballer  
 Amílcar Cabral, Bissau-Guinean/Cape Verdean politician  
 Amílcar de Castro, Brazilian sculptor and graphic designer  
 Amílcar Fonseca, Portuguese footballer  
 Amílcar Henríquez, Panamanian footballer  
 Amílcar Méndez Urízar, Guatemalan activist and politician  
 Amílcar Romero, Dominican politician  
 Amílcar de Sousa, Portuguese medical doctor and writer  
 Amílcar Spencer Lopes, Cape Verdean politician  
 Amílcar Villafuerte Trujillo, Mexican politician  
 Jean Amilcar, the Senegalese foster son of Marie Antoinette

References

Masculine given names
Portuguese masculine given names
Spanish masculine given names